Hilobothea is a genus of longhorn beetles of the subfamily Lamiinae.

 Hilobothea caracensis Monné & Martins, 1979
 Hilobothea latevittata (Bates, 1865)

References

Colobotheini